The British men's national under 20 ice hockey team is the national under-20 ice hockey team of the United Kingdom. The team represents the United Kingdom at the International Ice Hockey Federation's IIHF World U20 Championship's World Junior Hockey Championship Division I.

External links
GB U20 Men - IHUK

I
Junior national ice hockey teams